The R1155 was a British communications receiver, commonly used in aircraft along with its associated T1154 transmitter. It was used extensively by the Royal Air Force during World War II, mainly in larger aircraft such as the Avro Lancaster, Handley Page Halifax, Vickers Wellington and Short Sunderland. Some were also used in vehicles and air-sea rescue launches.

The R1155 and T1154 sets were manufactured by several British radio manufacturers, including EKCO, Marconi, Plessey, and EMI. Ekco, who manufactured the R1155 and T1154 at its Aylesbury shadow factory, carried out extensive development work on both units before putting them into production, significantly improving on the original Marconi design.

Large numbers of war surplus R1155 radios were modified for private use postwar.

Different models

See also 
 Tinsel (codename)

External links 
R1155 Information page
R1155 Manual pages

World War II British electronics